Zwolle is a city and municipality in the Netherlands.

Zwolle may also refer to:
Zwolle, Gelderland, a village in Oost Gelre, Netherlands
Zwolle, Louisiana, a town in the United States
PEC Zwolle, a Dutch football club

People with the surname
Henk-Jan Zwolle, Dutch rower
Sandra Zwolle (born 1971), Dutch speed skater

Dutch-language surnames